Kfar Kisch is a moshav in northern Israel. Located adjacent to Mount Tabor, it falls under the jurisdiction of Lower Galilee Regional Council.

History
It was established in 1946 by Jewish soldiers demobilised from the British Army after World War II having served under Frederick Kisch, after whom the village was named. However political fractures led many of the founders to leave within the first year. A water shortage which forced the residents to transport water from the Tabor stream without proper equipment added to the problems, and until 1953 a steady stream of founding residents left the village. In that year conditions improved and Kfar Kisch began to absorb Jewish immigrants from Poland, Hungary, and the Soviet Union. Part of the village's land formerly belonged to the depopulated Palestinian village of Ma'dhar, south of the old village site.

References

British-Jewish culture in Israel
Hungarian-Jewish culture in Israel
Polish-Jewish culture in Israel
Russian-Jewish culture in Israel
Moshavim
Populated places established in 1946
1946 establishments in Mandatory Palestine
Populated places in Northern District (Israel)